Alice Hlebani Mthembu (born 10 June 1959) is a South African politician from KwaZulu-Natal. She is currently a Member of Parliament for the African National Congress.

Early life and education
Mthembu was born into a Zulu family on 10 June 1959. She has a matric certificate.

Political career
Mthembu was a member of the provincial executive committee of the African National Congress Women's League in KwaZulu-Natal.

Prior to the May 8, 2019 general election, Mthembu was the seventeenth candidate on the ANC's list of KwaZulu-Natal candidates for the National Assembly. The Democratic Alliance, an opposition party, urged the public to object to her candidature because she produced false documents in 2000 to try and prove that she married the late ANC Member of the Provincial Legislature in KwaZulu-Natal Shedrack Bheki Mthembu in January 1983. The court ruled against her.

She was elected to the National Assembly and sworn in on 22 May 2019. On 27 June, she became a member of the Portfolio Committee on Communications. In November 2020, Mthembu was named to the Portfolio Committee on Defence and Military Veterans and the Joint Standing Committee on Defence.

References

Living people
1959 births
Zulu people
People from KwaZulu-Natal
Members of the National Assembly of South Africa
Women members of the National Assembly of South Africa
African National Congress politicians